Anne Paluver (born 4 November 1952 in Tallinn) is an Estonian actress.

Paulver was born in Tallinn, the daughter of mathematician Nikolai Paluver. She attended schools in Tallinn, graduating from Tallinn No. 22 Secondary School in 1970 (now the Jakob Westholm Gymnasium). She studied mathematics at the University of Tartu before enrolling at the Tallinn State Conservatory in 1972 to study acting at the institution's Performing Arts Department. From 1976 until 1995, she worked at Estonian Drama Theatre and from 1995 until 2004, at the Vanalinnastuudio. Since 2005 she has been a freelance actress. Besides theatre roles she has played also in several films and television series. 

Paulver was married to was actor Toomas Ots, with whom she has two daughters. She had been in a relationship with actor Paul Poom, with whom she has a son.

Awards
 2012: Oskar Luts humor prize

Filmography

 1976: Aeg elada, aeg armastada
 1989: Äratus
 1997: Minu Leninid
 2004: Sigade revolutsioon
 2005: Kõrini! 	
 2008: Eestlane ja venelane
 2010–2019: ENSV 
 2013: Elavad pildid 
 2018: Klassikokkutulek 2: Pulmad ja matused

References

Living people
1952 births
Estonian stage actresses
Estonian film actresses
Estonian television actresses
Estonian musical theatre actresses
20th-century Estonian actresses
21st-century Estonian actresses
Estonian Academy of Music and Theatre alumni
Actresses from Tallinn